Michele Bartoli (born 27 May 1970, in Pisa) is a retired Italian road racing cyclist. Bartoli was a professional from 1992 until 2004 and was one of the most successful single-day classics specialists of his generation, especially in the Italian and Belgian races. On his palmarès are three of the five monuments of cycling—five in total: the 1996 Tour of Flanders, the 1997 and 1998 Liège–Bastogne–Liège and the 2002 and 2003 Giro di Lombardia. He won the UCI Road World Cup in 1997 and 1998. From 10 October 1998 until 6 June 1999, Bartoli was number one on the UCI Road World Rankings.

Considered one of the most versatile riders of his generation, Bartoli won a variety of classics. He won most of the major Italian one-day races—apart from Milan–San Remo—and was Italian national champion in 2000. In Belgium, he excelled in both the cobbled classics of Flanders and the hilly races in the Ardennes, which earned him the nickname Il Leoncino delle Fiandre ("The Little Lion of Flanders"). In addition to the classics, Bartoli has also won stage races, such as Tirreno–Adriatico and the Three Days of De Panne, and won two stages in the Giro d'Italia. He finished third in the world championships of 1996 and 1998.

Career

1993–1995: Mercatone Uno
Bartoli joined  as an amateur stagiaire in late 1992, signing his first professional contract starting in January 1993. He was competitive immediately, winning the overall and 3 stages at the first stage race he started, the 1993 Settimana Siciliana.

His breakthrough year was 1994, when he won the Brabantse Pijl, his first semi-classic win, and the thirteenth stage in the Giro d'Italia. In 1995, his star rose to prominence in the one-day classics, with fifth place in Milan–San Remo, seventh in the Tour of Flanders and third places in Liège–Bastogne–Liège and the Giro di Lombardia. He won the Three Days of De Panne and placed ninth overall in the Vuelta a España.

1996–1997: MG–Technogym
In 1996, he joined the MG–Technogym team of manager Giancarlo Ferretti. He became a specialist of the classic races and claimed his first career monument win in the 1996 Tour of Flanders after an attack on the Muur van Geraardsbergen and a 16 km solo to the finish. In summer, he was 19th overall in the Tour de France, before winning the Italian summer classics Giro del Veneto, GP di Larciano and Giro dell'Emilia. He finished third at the World Championships in Lugano behind Johan Museeuw and Mauro Gianetti.

In 1997, Bartoli won his first Liège–Bastogne–Liège, after distancing his last breakaway companion, Laurent Jalabert, in the final kilometre. His slender build (179 cm and 65 kg), combined with his feline ability to accelerate on steep climbs, made him the quintessential contender for the hilly Ardennes classics. At the end of 1997, he won the UCI World Cup, confirming his status as the most regular classic race specialist.

1998: World number one with Asics
In 1998, he transferred to the Asics team and had the most successful season of his career. He won his second Liège–Bastogne–Liège, again before Laurent Jalabert, after a long solo attack. In May, he won the GP of Aargau Canton in Switzerland and the thirteenth stage in the Giro d'Italia. Later in the year, he won Züri-Metzgete, his second World Cup race of 1998, as well as the Giro di Romagna, and finished third in the World Championships in Valkenburg behind Oscar Camenzind and Peter Van Petegem. He ended the season as world number one on the UCI Road World Rankings and won his second consecutive UCI World Cup. During his years with MG and Asics, Bartoli was helped by his friend and team mate Paolo Bettini, who became Bartoli's prime lieutenant in the races.

1999–2001: Mapei
In 1999, Bartoli and Bettini joined Mapei, the most successful classics team of the 1990s. He won Tirreno–Adriatico, the Brabantse Pijl and the Flèche Wallonne in the spring of 1999, but failed to win a monument race. In the 1999 Liège–Bastogne–Liège, Bartoli, seeking his third consecutive win, was distanced by rising star Frank Vandenbroucke and finished fourth behind his helper Bettini. In May 1999, Bartoli broke his kneecap in a crash in the Tour of Germany, which ended his season.

He returned to racing in 2000, but his Mapei team mate Paolo Bettini demanded a leading role, eventually leading to a feud between the two friends. In the summer of 2000, he won the Italian National Championship in Trieste and the Grand Prix de Plouay, before entering the Olympic road race in Sydney. Helped by his Italian team mates Bettini and Danilo Di Luca, he won the sprint for fourth place, finishing just outside the medals. He repeated his fourth place at the World championships.

In 2001, Bartoli won Omloop Het Volk early in the season, but failed to win another major spring classic. He left Mapei—exceptionally mid-season—to re-join Ferretti at the new  team. In October 2001, Bartoli and Bettini's rivalry culminated during the world championship road race during which Bartoli refused to work for Bettini. Bettini finished second in the sprint behind Spaniard Óscar Freire; Bartoli was 23rd.

2002–2004: Final years
With , he re-lived some of his former successes by winning the 2002 Amstel Gold Race and the 2002 and 2003 Giro di Lombardia.

In 2004, he moved to  but failed to claim a victory. In the 2004 Tour de France, he abandoned during the 18th stage after being called back by manager Bjarne Riis from a break to protect his captain Ivan Basso.
Bartoli ended his professional career at the end of the 2004 season, suffering minor injuries. He stated: "I just wasn't motivated to continue... I can't be a top-level rider any more and that was a major influence on my decision, rather than my recent physical problems."

Retirement
In 2005 Bartoli gave his name to the Granfondo Michele Bartoli in the province of Lucca, with the start and finish in his hometown Montecarlo, Tuscany. Bartoli is, with former cyclists Francesco Casagrande and Maximilian Sciandri, instructor of the Campagnolo Passion 2 Ride.

Doping allegations
In May 2007, Italian newspaper La Gazzetta dello Sport reported that Bartoli was linked with the Operación Puerto doping investigation into the practices of Eufemiano Fuentes. According to the report, it was alleged that Bartoli was the rider behind the nickname "Sansone". The report continued that Bartoli received two blood transfusions from Fuentes in 2003.

Major results

 1993
 1st  Overall Settimana Internazionale di Coppi e Bartali
1st Stages 1 & 6
 6th Coppa Bernocchi
 7th La Flèche Wallonne
 7th GP Industria & Artigianato di Larciano
 9th Gent–Wevelgem
 9th Coppa Sabatini
 9th Trofeo Matteotti
 9th Giro del Friuli
 10th Overall Hofbrau Cup
 1994
 1st Brabantse Pijl
 1st Grand Prix Pino Cerami
 1st Criterium d'Abruzzo
 1st Stage 14 Giro d'Italia
 2nd Giro del Veneto
 3rd Overall Vuelta a los Valles Mineros
 5th Road race, National Road Championships
 6th Giro di Toscana
 7th Overall Giro del Trentino
 9th GP Industria & Artigianato di Larciano
 10th Paris–Brussels
 10th Giro della Romagna
 1995
 1st  Overall Three Days of De Panne
1st Stages 1 & 2
 3rd Liège–Bastogne–Liège
 3rd Giro di Lombardia
 5th Overall Volta a la Comunitat Valenciana
 5th Milan–San Remo
 5th Grand Prix Pino Cerami
 6th Firenze–Pistoia
 7th Tour of Flanders
 8th Gran Piemonte
 9th Overall Vuelta a España
 9th Paris–Tours
 10th Amstel Gold Race
 1996
 1st Tour of Flanders
 1st Giro dell'Emilia
 1st Grand Prix de Fourmies
 1st Giro del Veneto
 1st GP Industria & Artigianato di Larciano
 1st Giro della Provincia di Reggio Calabria
 1st Stage 6 Tirreno–Adriatico
 1st Stage 1 Tour de Suisse
 2nd Züri-Metzgete
 2nd Giro della Romagna
 3rd  Road race, UCI Road World Championships
 3rd Paris–Brussels
 5th Grand Prix La Marseillaise
 5th Wincanton Classic
 6th Paris–Tours
 6th Milano–Torino
 6th Gran Premio Città di Camaiore
 7th Overall Étoile de Bessèges
 8th Road race, Olympic Games
 8th Coppa Sabatini
 10th Coppa Bernocchi
 1997
 1st  Overall UCI Road World Cup
 1st Liège–Bastogne–Liège
 1st Rund um den Henninger Turm
 1st Trofeo Laigueglia
 1st Trofeo Melinda
 2nd Overall Tour Méditerranéen
1st Stage 5 
 2nd Giro di Toscana
 3rd Grand Prix de Fourmies
 4th Giro di Lombardia
 4th La Flèche Wallonne
 4th Paris–Brussels
 4th Gran Premio Bruno Beghelli
 5th Milan–San Remo
 6th Amstel Gold Race
 6th Züri-Metzgete
 7th Tour of Flanders
 8th Overall Tirreno–Adriatico
1st Stage 3
 9th Coppa Bernocchi
 10th Road race, UCI Road World Championships
 1998
 1st  Overall UCI Road World Cup
 1st  Overall Three Days of De Panne
 1st Liège–Bastogne–Liège
 1st Züri-Metzgete
 1st Giro della Provincia di Reggio Calabria
 1st Giro della Romagna
 1st Grand Prix of Aargau Canton
 1st Stage 13 Giro d'Italia
 2nd E3 Prijs Vlaanderen
 2nd Coppa Sabatini
 2nd HEW Cyclassics
 3rd  Road race, UCI Road World Championships
 3rd Amstel Gold Race
 3rd Giro dell'Emilia
 3rd Paris–Brussels
 4th Giro di Lombardia
 5th Overall Tour Méditerranéen
1st Stages 2 & 6
 5th La Flèche Wallonne
 5th Chrono des Nations
 6th Tour of Flanders
 8th Milan–San Remo
 8th Giro del Veneto
 1999
 1st  Overall Tirreno–Adriatico
 1st La Flèche Wallonne
 1st Brabantse Pijl
 1st Stage 3 Vuelta a Andalucía
 4th Tour of Flanders
 4th Liège–Bastogne–Liège
 4th E3 Prijs Vlaanderen
 8th Overall Volta a la Comunitat Valenciana
1st Stage 4 
 2000
 1st  Road race, National Road Championships
 1st GP Ouest-France
 1st Stage 2 Vuelta a Andalucía
 2nd Trofeo Melinda
 2nd Gran Premio Città di Camaiore
 3rd Coppa Placci
 4th Road race, UCI Road World Championships
 4th Road race, Olympic Games
 5th Giro di Lombardia
 5th Giro di Romagna
 8th Giro del Veneto
 9th Overall Giro della Provincia di Lucca
 2001
 1st Omloop Het Volk
 1st Gran Premio Città di Camaiore
 2nd Road race, National Road Championships
 5th Giro di Lombardia
 5th Classic Haribo
 7th Amstel Gold Race
 10th Paris–Nice
 2002
 1st  Overall Tour Méditerranéen
1st Stages 1 (TTT) & 4 
 1st Giro di Lombardia
 1st Amstel Gold Race
 1st Giro dell'Emilia
 1st Milano–Torino
 1st Stage 2 Giro della Provincia di Lucca
 3rd La Flèche Wallonne
 5th Trofeo Laigueglia
 6th Züri-Metzgete
 6th Coppa Sabatini
 8th Grand Prix de Fourmies
 2003
 1st Giro di Lombardia
 1st Giro del Lazio
 2nd Overall Tour de Wallonie
1st Stage 3 
 2nd Giro del Veneto
 4th Trofeo Matteotti
 7th Giro dell'Emilia
 8th Coppa Placci
2004 
 7th Overall Tour of Britain

Classics results timeline

Major championships timeline

References

External links

 
 
 
 Tour de France results
 Palmares by cyclingbase.com

Italian male cyclists
Cyclists at the 1996 Summer Olympics
Cyclists at the 2000 Summer Olympics
Olympic cyclists of Italy
Italian Giro d'Italia stage winners
Sportspeople from Pisa
1970 births
Living people
Tour de Suisse stage winners
UCI Road World Cup winners
UCI Road World Rankings winners
Cyclists from Tuscany